Cleptor is a genus of leaf beetles in the subfamily Eumolpinae. It is known from Australia.

Species
Species include:

 Cleptor apicistriatus Lea, 1915
 Cleptor australis (Jacoby, 1880)
 Cleptor bigener Lea, 1915
 Cleptor caerulea Lea, 1915
 Cleptor chloropterus Lea, 1915
 Cleptor coriaceus Lea, 1915
 Cleptor electus Lea, 1915
 Cleptor globulus Lea, 1915
 Cleptor goudiei Lea, 1915
 Cleptor haroldi Blackburn, 1900
 Cleptor laevicollis Lea, 1915
 Cleptor minutus Lea, 1915
 Cleptor mjoebergi Weise, 1923
 Cleptor multicolor Lea, 1915
 Cleptor pallidiventris Lea, 1915
 Cleptor paradoxa (Blackburn, 1889)
 Cleptor rufimanus Lefèvre, 1885
 Cleptor semiviridis Lea, 1915
 Cleptor striatipectus Lea, 1915
 Cleptor subhumeralis Lea, 1915
 Cleptor tersus Lea, 1915
 Cleptor xanthopus (Harold, 1879)

References

External links
 Genus Cleptor Lefèvre, 1885 at Australian Faunal Directory

Eumolpinae
Chrysomelidae genera
Beetles of Australia
Taxa named by Édouard Lefèvre